Adam Cushman (born October 10, 1974) is an American film director, producer, screenwriter and author. He directed the films Restraint and The Maestro. His books include the novel "Cut" (2014) and "Critically Acclaimed" (2018).

Life and career 
Cushman grew up in Miami, Florida and attended The University of Miami and Columbia University for graduate studies. In 2017 he wrote and directed the psychological horror film Restraint starring Dana Ashbrook and Caitlyn Folley. The film was released in November 2018 by Breaking Glass Pictures. His second feature film was the historical period drama The Maestro, starring Xander Berkeley as real-life composer Mario Castelnuovo-Tedesco.

Restraint premiered at the Rhode Island International Film Festival in 2018, where it won the festival's top prize, the "Best Narrative Feature" award. It also played the 2017 Downtown Los Angeles Film Festival and 2018 Queens World Festival where Cushman was both times awarded "Best Director". The Maestro premiered at the 2017 Heartland Film Festival and won awards at other festivals for both the film and lead actor Xander Berkeley. In a complimentary review of The Maestro, Nick Schager of Variety wrote, "Cushman crafts his material with sunlight-dappled aesthetic elegance. And even when he indulges in spinning, arm-twirling pontificating, Berkeley brings a calm soulfulness to Castelnuovo-Tedesco."

Cushman is also the founder of Film 14, which produces book trailers for publishers such as Penguin Teen, Harper Collins, and MacMillan as well as individual authors.

Filmography 
Feature films

 Restraint (2017) – director, writer, producer
 The Maestro (2018) – director, editor, producer

Short films

 Five Families (2019) - director, writer, producer

References 

American film directors
1974 births
Living people
People from Miami
University of Miami alumni